Elizabeth Mwesigwa (born 10 March 1992) is a Ugandan para-badminton player and she is ranked as the country's number one in the SL3 category. She won a gold medal at Uganda's para-badminton international in 2018. As of February 2020, she is ranked 12 worldwide in the Women's para-badminton SL3 Category by the Badminton World Federation.

Background and education 
Mwesigwa was born as the first of six children of Godfrey Kakaire, in Naigobya, Iganga District. She was born with a congenital defect that created an impairment of both legs below the knees. After undergoing an operation for her limbs in Tororo, Mwesigwa returned to Iganga and was enrolled at Iganga Infants School then Pride Academy Iganga which she left in 2009 after completing her Primary Leaving Examinations (PLE). In 2010, she moved to Kampala and joined Naguru High School but dropped out in 2011 in her first term of Senior Two.

She later supported herself as a hawker before relocating to Kigali, Rwanda in 2012.

Sports 
In 2013, Mwesigwa was introduced to sports through basketball during her stay in Kigali, Rwanda. On her return to Kampala in 2015, she featured in a number of wheelchair basketball games before attending a week-long training course with Richard Morris, an Engllsh para-badminton coach. She took up para-badminton, training through 2015 and 2016, and eventually featuring in her first tournament (Uganda Para-badminton International) in 2017 and winning a gold medal.

In 2018, Mwesigwa won a gold in the African Para-Badminton Championships held in Kampala, Uganda after beating Nigeria's Gift Ijeoma Chukwuemeka in the Women's SL3 final.

In 2019, she again represented Uganda at the second Fazza-Dubai Para-Badminton International.

Qualification for Olympics 
In 2019, Mwesigwa was part of a 5-person Ugandan contingent that played at the TOTAL BWF Para-badminton World Championships that were held in Basel, Switzerland. She featured in the Women's SL3 Group B , the Women's SL3 – SU5 doubles (partnered with Asha Kipwene Munene) and also in the mixed doubles where she partnered with Paddy Kasirye.

Members of the Parliament of Uganda had earlier resolved to contribute USD 10,000 that was to help her participate in tournaments in Thailand, France, Australia and Japan that would then help her gain points to qualify for the 2020 Paralympics.

Awards and recognition 
In 2019, Mwesigwa was named Tigress Honoree by the Malengo Foundation in recognition of her being Uganda's gold medal winner at the Para-African Badminton championships of 2018.

Achievements

African Championships 
Women's singles

Women's doubles

Mixed doubles

BWF Para Badminton World Circuit (1 runner-up) 
The BWF Para Badminton World Circuit – Grade 2, Level 1, 2 and 3 tournaments has been sanctioned by the Badminton World Federation from 2022.

Women's singles

International Tournaments (1 title) 
Men's doubles

See also 

 Badminton Confederation Africa
 Badminton at the Summer Paralympics
 BWF Para-Badminton World Championships

References

Notes

External links 

 Elizabeth Mwesigwa player profile and ranking at BWF
 Uganda Badminton Association
 Uganda Paralympics Committee
 Badminton Confederation Africa

1992 births
Living people
Ugandan female badminton players
People from Iganga District